The 2006 NCAA Division III men's basketball tournament was the 32nd annual single-elimination tournament to determine the national champions of National Collegiate Athletic Association (NCAA) men's Division III collegiate basketball in the United States.

The field contained sixty-four teams, and each program was allocated to one of four sectionals. All sectional games were played on campus sites, while the national semifinals, third-place final, and championship finals were contested at the Salem Civic Center in Salem, Virginia.

Virginia Wesleyan defeated Wittenberg, 59–56, in the championship, clinching their first national title.

The Marlins (30–3) were coached by David Macedo.

Ton Ton Balenga, also from Virginia Wesleyan, was named Most Outstanding Player.

Championship Rounds
Site: Salem Civic Center, Salem, Virginia

See also
2006 NCAA Division I men's basketball tournament
2006 NCAA Division II men's basketball tournament
2006 NCAA Division III women's basketball tournament
2006 NAIA Division I men's basketball tournament

References

NCAA Division III men's basketball tournament
Ncaa Tournament
NCAA Men's Division III Basketball